Snoring is the vibration of respiratory structures and the resulting sound due to obstructed air movement during breathing while sleeping. The sound may be soft or loud and unpleasant. Snoring during sleep may be a sign, or first alarm, of obstructive sleep apnea (OSA). Research suggests that snoring is one of the factors of sleep deprivation.

Causes
Snoring is the result of the relaxation of the uvula and soft palate. These tissues can relax enough to partially block the airway, resulting in irregular airflow and vibrations. Snoring can be attributed to one or more of the following:
 Genetic predisposition, a proportion of which may be mediated through other heritable lifestyle factors such as body mass index, smoking and alcohol consumption.
Throat weakness, causing the throat to close during sleep.
 Mispositioned jaw, often caused by tension in the muscles.
 Obesity that has caused fat to gather in and around the throat.
 Obstruction in the nasal passageway.
 Obstructive sleep apnea.
 Sleep deprivation.
 Relaxants such as alcohol or other drugs relaxing throat muscles.
 Sleeping on one's back, which may result in the tongue dropping to the back of the mouth.
 Mouth breathing

Possible consequences
Snoring is known to cause sleep deprivation to snorers and those around them, as well as daytime drowsiness, irritability, lack of focus and decreased libido. It has also been suggested that it can cause significant psychological and social damage to those affected. Multiple studies reveal a positive correlation between loud snoring and risk of heart attack (about +34% chance) and stroke (about +67% chance).

Though snoring is often considered a minor condition, snorers can sometimes experience severe impairment of lifestyle. The between-subjects trial by Armstrong et al. discovered a statistically significant improvement in marital relations after snoring was surgically corrected. This was confirmed by evidence from Gall et al., Cartwright and Knight and Fitzpatrick et al.

Studies have associated loud snoring with the development of carotid artery atherosclerosis. Amatoury et al. demonstrated that snoring vibrations are transmitted to the carotid artery, identifying a possible mechanism for snoring-associated carotid artery damage and atherosclerotic plaque development. These researchers also found amplification of the snoring energy within the carotid lumen at certain frequencies, adding to this scenario. Vibration of the carotid artery with snoring also lends itself as a potential mechanism for atherosclerotic plaque rupture and consequently ischemic stroke. Researchers also hypothesize that loud snoring could create turbulence in carotid artery blood flow. Generally speaking, increased turbulence irritates blood cells and has previously been implicated as a cause of atherosclerosis. While there is plausibility and initial evidence to support snoring as an independent source of carotid artery/cardiovascular disease, additional research is required to further clarify this hypothesis.

Treatment
So far, there is no certain treatment that can completely stop snoring. Almost all treatments for snoring revolve around lessening the breathing discomfort by clearing the blockage in the air passage. Medications are usually not helpful in treating snoring symptoms, though they can help control some of the underlying causes such as nasal congestion and allergic reactions. Doctors, therefore, often recommend lifestyle changes as a first-line treatment to stop snoring. This is the reason snorers are advised to lose weight (to stop fat from pressing on the throat), stop smoking (smoking weakens and clogs the throat), avoid alcohol and sedative medications before bedtime (they relax the throat and tongue muscles, which in turn narrow the airways) and sleep on their side (to prevent the tongue from blocking the throat).

A number of other treatment options are also used to stop snoring. These range from over-the-counter aids such as nasal sprays, nasal strips or nose clips, lubricating sprays, oral appliances and "anti-snore" clothing and pillows, to unusual activities such as playing the didgeridoo. Many over-the-counter snoring treatments, such as stop-snoring rings or wrist-worn electrical stimulation bands, have no scientific evidence to support their claims.

Tongue exercises
Myofunctional therapy, which incorporates oropharyngeal and tongue exercises, reduces snoring in adults based on both subjective questionnaires and objective sleep studies. Snoring intensity was reduced by 51%.

Orthopedic pillows

Orthopedic pillows are the least intrusive option for reducing snoring. These pillows are designed to support the head and neck in a way that ensures the jaw stays open and slightly forward. This helps keep the airways unrestricted as possible and in turn leads to a small reduction in snoring.

Dental appliances

Specially made dental appliances called mandibular advancement splints, which advance the lower jaw slightly and thereby pull the tongue forward, are a common mode of treatment for snoring. Such appliances have been proven to be effective in reducing snoring and sleep apnea in cases where the apnea is mild to moderate. Mandibular advancement splints are often tolerated much better than CPAP machines.

Positive airway pressure

A continuous positive airway pressure (CPAP) machine is often used to control sleep apnea and the snoring associated with it. It is a relatively safe medical treatment. To keep the airway open, a device pumps a controlled stream of air through a flexible hose to a mask worn over the nose, mouth, or both. A CPAP is usually applied through a CPAP mask which is placed over the nose and/or mouth. The air pressure required to keep the airway open is delivered through this and it is attached to a CPAP machine which is like an air compressor.

The air that CPAP delivers is generally "normal air" – not concentrated oxygen. The machine utilizes the air pressure as an "air splint" to keep the airway open. In obstructive sleep apnea, the airway at the rear of the throat is prone to closure.

Surgery
Surgery is also available as a method of correcting social snoring. Some procedures, such as uvulopalatopharyngoplasty, attempt to widen the airway by removing tissues in the back of the throat, including the uvula and pharynx. These surgeries are quite invasive, however, and there are risks of adverse side effects. The most dangerous risk is that enough scar tissue could form within the throat as a result of the incisions to make the airway more narrow than it was prior to surgery, diminishing the airspace in the velopharynx. Scarring is an individual trait, so it is difficult for a surgeon to predict how much a person might be predisposed to scarring. Currently, the American Medical Association does not approve of the use of lasers to perform operations on the pharynx or uvula.

Radiofrequency ablation (RFA) is a relatively new surgical treatment for snoring. This treatment applies radiofrequency energy and heat (between 77 °C and 85 °C) to the soft tissue at the back of the throat, such as the soft palate and uvula, causing scarring of the tissue beneath the skin. After healing, this results in stiffening of the treated area. The procedure takes less than one hour, is usually performed on an outpatient basis, and usually requires several treatment sessions. Radiofrequency ablation is frequently effective in reducing the severity of snoring, but often does not eliminate it.

Bipolar radiofrequency ablation, a technique used for coblation tonsillectomy, is also used for the treatment of snoring.

Pillar procedure
The pillar procedure is a minimally invasive treatment for snoring and obstructive sleep apnea. In the United States, this procedure was FDA indicated in 2004.  During this procedure, three to six+ Dacron (the material used in permanent sutures) strips are inserted into the soft palate, using a modified syringe and local anesthetic. While the procedure was initially approved for the insertion of three "pillars" into the soft palate, it was found that there was a significant dosage response to more pillars, with appropriate candidates. As a result of this outpatient operation, which typically lasts no more than 30 minutes, the soft palate is more rigid, possibly reducing instances of sleep apnea and snoring.  This procedure addresses one of the most common causes of snoring and sleep apnea — vibration or collapse of the soft palate (the soft part of the roof of the mouth).  If there are other factors contributing to snoring or sleep apnea, such as conditions of the nasal airway or an enlarged tongue, it will likely need to be combined with other treatments to be more effective.

Epidemiology
Statistics on snoring are often contradictory, but at least 30% of adults and perhaps as many as 50% of people in some demographics snore. One survey of 5,713 American residents identified habitual snoring in 24% of men and 13.8% of women, rising to 60% of men and 40% of women aged 60 to 65 years; this suggests an increased susceptibility to snoring with age.

An observational study in the UK Biobank estimated that ~37% of 408,317 participants were habitual snorers, and confirmed positive associations with larger body-mass index, lower socio-economic status and more frequent smoking and alcohol consumption.

Further reading

References 

Sleep disorders
Symptoms and signs: Respiratory system